Cirripectes alleni, the Kimberley blenny, is a species of combtooth blenny found in coral reefs in the eastern Indian Ocean, around Australia.  This species reaches a length of  TL. The specific name honours the ichthyologist Gerald R. Allen.

References

alleni
Taxa named by Jeffrey T. Williams
Fish described in 1993